René Makosso (born 16 February 1979) is a Congolese swimmer. He competed in the men's 50 metre freestyle event at the 1996 Summer Olympics.

References

1979 births
Living people
Republic of the Congo male swimmers
Olympic swimmers of the Republic of the Congo
Swimmers at the 1996 Summer Olympics
Place of birth missing (living people)